The 2016 SABA Women's Championship was the 1st SABA Women's Championship. The tournament was held from 29 March to 2 April in Kathmandu, Nepal. Five (5) teams are reported to join the women's maiden tournament for SABA subzone, one of FIBA Asia's subzone. India, Pakistan and Afghanistan were reportedly not seeing action in the five-day competition.

Sri Lanka won their first ever subzone championship by thrashing hosts Nepal in the final game, 75-49. Maldives scored their second successive international win against Bhutan in the penultimate day of the tournament, 69-46, to bag the bronze medal.

Standings

Results
All times are in Nepal Standard Time (UTC+05:45)

Final standings

Awards

References

2016
2016 in women's basketball
2015–16 in Asian basketball
2016 in Nepalese sport
International basketball competitions hosted by Nepal